Acacia idiomorpha is a shrub belonging to the genus Acacia and the subgenus Phyllodineae that is endemic to a small area of western Australia.

Description
Like most species of Acacia it has phyllodes rather than true leaves. The undulate and pungent phyllodes have an asymmetrically ovate to narrowly ovate shape but can be elliptic or narrowly oblong-elliptic. It produces yellow flowers from July to August. The seed pods that form after flowering have a narrowly oblong shape and are usually curved.

Distribution
It is native to an area along the west coast in the Wheatbelt and Mid West regions of Western Australia situated on near-coastal cliffs  and dunes growing in sandy or loamy soils usually over or around limestone or sandstone. The range of the plants extends along the coast from around Ledge Point in the south up to Tamala Station and Dirk Hartog Island in Shark Bay in the north. It is often part of mallee groves or shrubland communities.

See also
List of Acacia species

References

idiomorpha
Acacias of Western Australia
Taxa named by George Bentham
Plants described in 1842